In Greek mythology, Phoenice or Phoenike (Ancient Greek: Φοινίκη) may refer to three distinct characters:

 Phoenice, an Attican princess as the daughter of the autochthonous King Actaion and sister to Aglauros, Erse and Pandrosos. After she died a virgin, her father named after her the Phoenician letters in her honour.
 Phoenice, a Phoenician princess as the daughter of King Phoenix and Telephe. She was sister to Europa, Astypalea and Peirus. Phoenice was said to be the mother of Proteus by the god of the sea, Poseidon.
 Phoenice, a dear companion of Artemis who was seduced (or raped) by Zeus. When she found out, Artemis turned her into a bear, and then later fixed her among the stars as the constellation Ursa Minor.

Notes

References 
 
 Stephanus of Byzantium, Stephani Byzantii Ethnicorum quae supersunt, edited by August Meineike (1790–1870), published 1849. A few entries from this important ancient handbook of place names have been translated by Brady Kiesling. Online version at the Topos Text Project.
 Suida, Suda Encyclopedia translated by Ross Scaife, David Whitehead, William Hutton, Catharine Roth, Jennifer Benedict, Gregory Hays, Malcolm Heath Sean M. Redmond, Nicholas Fincher, Patrick Rourke, Elizabeth Vandiver, Raphael Finkel, Frederick Williams, Carl Widstrand, Robert Dyer, Joseph L. Rife, Oliver Phillips and many others. Online version at the Topos Text Project.

Princesses in Greek mythology
Agenorides
Women of Poseidon
Attican characters in Greek mythology
Phoenician characters in Greek mythology
Attic mythology
Mortal women of Zeus
Metamorphoses into animals in Greek mythology
Deeds of Artemis
Retinue of Artemis
Ursa Minor (constellation)